Recep İvedik 5 It is a Turk8ish comedy film, directed by Togan Gökbakar and written by Şahan Gökbakar. It is the fifth film in the Recep İvedik film series. The film stars Şahan Gökbakar, Orkan Varan and Deniz Ceylan. The movie was released on February 16, 2017. The production of the film, which was shot in Istanbul, Antalya and Skopje, is Laundry Film. The film was watched by 7.4 million people in Turkey and earned ₺85.9 million, making it one of the country's most watched and highest-grossing films.

Storyline 
During his visit of condolence to Ismet's funeral, Recep Ivedik feels sorry about Ismet's remaining family members due to his latest unfinished job contract which would cause hard financial situation for the family. Therefore, Recep decides to finish Ismet's last job by replacing himself as a bus driver and to transport group of athletes. Although Recep and his accompanying friend Nurullah were expecting this could be a short trip, they learn that it is not because they have to transport young national athletes to sports organization in a foreign country. This becomes the beginning for them to have irreversible adventure. When they are on the road, unfortunate things happen and crisis appears for the team. Recep, who believes only in victory, takes control of the situation and develops his own methods in order to make the team successful while he face with all funny events. With his own unique comedy, Recep Ivedik continues his adventure in this fifth story.

Cast 
 Şahan Gökbakar as Recep İvedik
 Orkan Varan as Akif Özeren
 Nurullah Çelebi as Nurullah Sağlam
 Deniz Ceylan as Head of Departure Hakan
 Şahabettin Karabulut as Zıp Zıp Orhan
 Gönen Fatih Yemez as Jan Klod Adnan
 Murat Bölücek as Biberli Hasan
 Ümit Özkurt as Kuleci Erdal
 Hüseyin Baycur as Beton Adem

Sequels

External links 
 

2017 films
2010s sports comedy films
Turkish comedy films
2010s Turkish-language films
Films set in North Macedonia
Films shot in Istanbul
Films shot in North Macedonia
Films set in Istanbul
Association football films
Turkish sequel films
2017 comedy films
Films directed by Togan Gökbakar